Allan Powell Jones (6 January 1940 – September 1993) was a Welsh professional footballer who played as a full back. He is best remembered for the seven years he spent in the Football League with Brentford, making over 280 appearances for the club. He was posthumously inducted into the Brentford Hall of Fame in 2015.

Career

Liverpool 
Jones began his career at Second Division club Liverpool, joining as an amateur in April 1955. After two years in the youth team, Jones signed a professional contract in April 1957. He had to wait until 19 December 1959 to make his first team debut, when he deputised for John Molyneux in a 4–0 victory over Cardiff City, a match also notable for the fact that it was Bill Shankly's first in management at Anfield. Jones went on to make only four further appearances for Liverpool (all in April 1963) and he departed the club in August 1963.

Brentford 
Jones signed for newly-promoted Third Division club Brentford for a £5,000 fee in August 1963. He became an integral part of the team at left back and made 55 appearances during the 1963–64 season. Jones took over the right back position when Ken Coote retired in 1964 and despite being placed on the transfer list at his own request in August 1966, he averaged 35 league appearances per season until 1969–70, when he made only 13 appearances in all competitions, mostly in a utility role. He departed Griffin Park at the end of the 1969–70 season and made 281 appearances and scored three goals in seven seasons with the club. Jones was posthumously inducted into the Brentford Hall of Fame in 2015.

Croatia 
Jones signed a two-year contract with Australian club Croatia in 1970.

International career 
Jones played for Wales Schoolboys and his mid-1960s performances for Brentford drew the attention of the senior selectors, but he failed to win a call into a squad.

Career statistics

Honours 
Brentford
 London Challenge Cup: 1966–67

Individual

 Brentford Hall of Fame

References 

1940 births
Welsh footballers
Liverpool F.C. players
Brentford F.C. players
People from Flint, Flintshire
Sportspeople from Flintshire
1993 deaths
English Football League players
Welsh expatriate footballers
Expatriate soccer players in Australia
Welsh expatriate sportspeople in Australia
Association football fullbacks